"Israel" is a song by British rock band Siouxsie and the Banshees, released as a stand-alone single in 1980 by Polydor Records. The track was written by Siouxsie and the Banshees and co-produced with Nigel Gray, it featured a 30 singer Welsh choir on backing vocals. While touring in Europe in autumn 1980, the band wanted to write a Christmas song to be released on time for December of that year. They composed it on the road, which was quite unusual for them.

The song became a favourite of several artists including Air's composer Jean-Benoît Dunckel who selected as one of his 10 all-time favourite songs, and the band Ride who selected it as a song of their intro tape during their tours, and producer Howie B. (a frequent collaborator of Björk and Tricky in the 1990s) who included it in a list of songs, representing the music he listened to when he grew up in Glasgow.

Release
"Israel" was released as a stand-alone single in between the albums Kaleidoscope (1980) and Juju (1981) on 28 November 1980 by record label Polydor. It peaked at No. 41 on the UK Singles Chart. It was the band's first single to be also released on a 12-inch although the track lengths on both sides of the 12-inch edition were the same as on the 7-inch.

Although it reached No. 73 on the US National Disco Action Top 100 chart as an import, "Israel" did not appear on a Siouxsie and the Banshees album until the release of the Once Upon a Time/The Singles compilation the following year, although some copies of the US release of Juju on PVC Records included a free copy of this single.

The song was remastered in 2002 for the compilation CD The Best of Siouxsie and the Banshees and was also featured as a bonus track on the 2006 Kaleidoscope reissue.

Cover version
"Israel" was later covered by Nouvelle Vague on their 2006 album Bande à Part.

Track listing

Charts

References

1980 singles
1980 songs
Polydor Records singles
Siouxsie and the Banshees songs
Songs written by Budgie (musician)
Songs written by John McGeoch
Songs written by Siouxsie Sioux
Songs written by Steven Severin
Songs about Israel
British Christmas songs